The 1984 ABN World Tennis Tournament was a men's tennis tournament played on indoor carpet courts at Rotterdam Ahoy in the Netherlands. It was part of the 1984 Volvo Grand Prix circuit. The tournament was held from 12 March through 18 March 1984. The singles final between Ivan Lendl and Jimmy Connors was stopped at 6–0, 1–0 because the Ahoy Arena had received an anonymous telephone bomb threat. The police searched the venue but no bomb was found. The match was not resumed and officially has no winner.

Finals

Singles

 Ivan Lendl led  Jimmy Connors 6–0, 1–0 canc. Lendl and Connors both received runners-up finishes.

Doubles

 Kevin Curren /  Wojciech Fibak defeated  Fritz Buehning /  Ferdi Taygan 6–4, 6–4

References

External links
 Official website 
 Official website 
 ATP tournament profile
 ITF tournament details

 
ABN World Tennis Tournament
ABN World Tennis Tournament
ABN World Tennis Tournament